Popovtsi may refer to one of the following villages in Bulgaria:
 Popovtsi, Gabrovo Province
 Popovtsi, Sofia Province
 Popovtsi in Veliko Turnovo Province, more commonly known as Voinezha, Veliko Turnovo Province